Abdullah Ghamran (Arabic:عبد الله غمران) (born 4 July 1994) is an Emirati footballer who plays as a defender .

External links

References

Emirati footballers
1994 births
Living people
Al Ain FC players
Al-Ittihad Kalba SC players
Dibba FC players
Association football defenders
Place of birth missing (living people)
UAE First Division League players
UAE Pro League players